Martin Hermannsson (born 16 September 1994) is an Icelandic professional basketball player for Valencia of the Spanish Liga ACB and the EuroLeague. He also internationally represents the Icelandic national basketball team, with which he participated in the EuroBasket 2015 and EuroBasket 2017. In 2019, Martin was named the Icelandic Men's Basketball Player of the Year for the fourth year in a row.

Playing career
Martin started his senior team career with KR at the age of 15. With KR, he went on to win the Icelandic championship twice, in 2011 and 2014. In 2014 he was named the Domestic Player of the Year, the Playoffs MVP and the Young Player of the Year while also being selected to the Domestic All-First Team.

On 17 May 2017, he was selected for the LNB Pro B All-First Team and was the runner-up to the Most Valuable Player award. He switched to Champagne Châlons-Reims Basket of the LNB Pro A for the 2017–18 season.

On 29 June 2018, Martin signed with Alba Berlin of the Basketball Bundesliga. On 7 November, he injured his ankle in Alba's 106–101 victory against Tofaş in the EuroCup and was expected to miss 6 weeks. He returned from injury on 27 December, scoring a game high 19 points in only 20 minutes, in Alba's 108–96 victory against Giessen 46ers. On 22 January 2019, Martin scored 17 straight points in the third quarter in against Rytas Vilnius in the EuroCup, helping Alba cut the lead from 21 points to 4 points. He scored 20 of his 25 points in the second half, including three free throws with 0.9 seconds remaining that gave Alba an 87–85 victory. On 17 February, he had 6 points and 6 assists in Alba's narrow 82–83 loss against Brose Bamberg in the German Basketball Cup Finals. In June 2019, Martin and Alba lost to Bayern München in the Bundesliga finals 0–3.

In December 2019, Martin was named the Icelandic Men's Basketball Player of the Year for the fourth straight season. He finished second in the vote for the Icelandic Sportsperson of the Year. On 17 January 2020, he scored 6 of his 13 points in overtime in a victory against Red Star Belgrade. On 17 February 2020, he led all scorers with 20 points in Alba's 89–67 victory against EWE Baskets Oldenburg in the German Basketball Cup finals. On 28 June 2020, Martin won the Basketball Bundesliga championship with Alba Berlin.

On 9 July 2020 Martin signed with Valencia of the Spanish Liga ACB.

On 16 December 2020, Martin was named the Icelandic Male Basketball Player of the Year for the fifth straight year.

On 30 May 2022, Martin tore his ACL in a Liga ACB playoffs match against Saski Baskonia. 

On 1 July 2022, Martin renewed his contract with Valencia for an additional two seasons.

Statistics

College

|-
| style="text-align:left;"| 2014–15
| style="text-align:left;"| LIU
| 30 || 30 || 31.2 || .391 || .275 || .864 || 3.8 || 3.3 || 0.9 || 0.2 || 10.1
|-
| style="text-align:left;"| 2015-16
| style="text-align:left;"| LIU
| 31 || 31 || 36.2 || .458 || .360 || .882 || 4.4 || 4.7 || 1.8 || 0.3 || 16.2
|- class="sortbottom"
| style="text-align:left;"| Career
| style="text-align:left;"|
| 61 || 61 || 33:8 || .431 || .322 || .875 || 4.1 || 4.0 || 1.3 || 0.2 || 13.2

Euroleague

|-
| style="text-align:left;"| 2019–20
| style="text-align:left;"| Alba Berlin
| 27 || 20 || 25.8 || .443 || .337 || .860 || 1.6 || 4.8 || 0.5 || 0.5 || 10.9 || 8.5
|- class="sortbottom"
| style="text-align:left;"| Career
| style="text-align:left;"|
| 27 || 20 || 25.8 || .443 || .337 || .860 || 1.6 || 4.8 || 0.5 || 0.5 || 10.9 || 8.5

National team career
Martin debuted with the Icelandic national team during the 2013 Games of the Small States of Europe where the team finished third. With Iceland, he participated at the EuroBasket 2015 and EuroBasket 2017. On 10 August 2019, Martin scored the game winning basket with 0.7 seconds left in Iceland's 83–82 victory against Switzerland in the EuroBasket 2021 qualification. 20 seconds earlier had had also given Iceland temporally the lead with a difficult shot over Switzerland's Clint Capela at the shot clock buzzer.

Personal life
Martin is the son of former Icelandic national team player Hermann Hauksson.

Popular culture
Martin: Saga úr Vesturbæ is a 2017 documentary by Bjartur Sigurðsson about Martin's life and basketball career.

References

External links
 Martin Hermannsson at bbl.de
 Martin Hermannsson at euroleague.net
 Martin Hermannsson at lnb.fr
 

1994 births
Living people
Alba Berlin players
Champagne Châlons-Reims Basket players
Étoile Charleville-Mézières players
Martin Hermannsson
Martin Hermannsson
Martin Hermannsson
Martin Hermannsson
Martin Hermannsson
KR men's basketball players
Liga ACB players
LIU Brooklyn Blackbirds men's basketball players
Shooting guards
Martin Hermannsson
Martin Hermannsson
Valencia Basket players